Israeli polls do not take the electoral threshold (currently 3.25%) into account in a uniform fashion. Some polls report the number of seats each party would win purely according to the percentages, as though there were no threshold; others eliminate parties that poll below the threshold and distribute the 120 available Knesset seats only among those who pass it. As a result, parties that poll at or near the threshold can show inconsistent results, bouncing between 0 and the minimum 3 or 4 seats.

Polls may not add up to 120 seats due to rounding or omitted parties that drop out or do not poll consistently.

Other polls
 An iStudent poll (January 2015) found that, among college and university students, the Zionist Union would receive 30 mandates; Jewish Home, 26; and Likud, 16.

References

External links
 Israel Election 2015: Poll Central, Haaretz

Israel
Opinion polling in Israel